

Events

Pre-1600
 619 – A qaghan of the Western Turkic Khaganate is assassinated in a Chinese palace by Eastern Turkic rivals after the approval of Tang emperor Gaozu.
1410 – The Peace of Bicêtre suspends hostilities in the Armagnac–Burgundian Civil War.

1601–1900
1675 – Plymouth Colony governor Josiah Winslow leads a colonial militia against the Narragansett during King Philip's War.
1795 – The French Directory, a five-man revolutionary government, is created.
1868 – Time zone: New Zealand officially adopts a standard time to be observed nationally.
1882 – The great fire destroys a large part of Oulu's city center in Oulu Province, Finland.
1889 – North Dakota and South Dakota are admitted as the 39th and 40th U.S. states.
1899 – The Boers begin their 118-day siege of British-held Ladysmith during the Second Boer War.

1901–present
1912 – Bulgaria defeats the Ottoman Empire in the Battle of Lule Burgas, the bloodiest battle of the First Balkan War, which opens her way to Constantinople.
1914 – World War I: The Russian Empire declares war on the Ottoman Empire and the Dardanelles is subsequently closed.
1917 – The Balfour Declaration proclaims British support for the "establishment in Palestine of a national home for the Jewish people" with the clear understanding "that nothing shall be done which may prejudice the civil and religious rights of existing non-Jewish communities".
  1917   – The Military Revolutionary Committee of the Petrograd Soviet, in charge of preparation and carrying out the Russian Revolution, holds its first meeting.
1920 – In the United States, KDKA of Pittsburgh starts broadcasting as the first commercial radio station. The first broadcast is the result of the 1920 United States presidential election.
1936 – The British Broadcasting Corporation initiates the BBC Television Service, the world's first regular, "high-definition" (then defined as at least 200 lines) service. Renamed BBC1 in 1964, the channel still runs to this day.
1940 – World War II: First day of Battle of Elaia–Kalamas between the Greeks and the Italians.
1947 – In California, designer Howard Hughes performs the maiden (and only) flight of the Hughes H-4 Hercules (also known as the "Spruce Goose"), the largest fixed-wing aircraft ever built until Scaled Composites rolled out their Stratolaunch in May 2017.
1949 – The Dutch–Indonesian Round Table Conference ends with the Netherlands agreeing to transfer sovereignty of the Dutch East Indies to the United States of Indonesia.
1951 – Canada in the Korean War: A platoon of The Royal Canadian Regiment defends a vital area against a full battalion of Chinese troops in the Battle of the Song-gok Spur. The engagement lasts into the early hours the next day.
1956 – Hungarian Revolution: Nikita Khrushchev meets with leaders of other Communist countries to seek their advice on the situation in Hungary, selecting János Kádár as the country's next leader on the advice of Josip Broz Tito.
  1956   – Suez Crisis: Israel occupies the Gaza Strip.
1959 – Quiz show scandals: Twenty-One game show contestant Charles Van Doren admits to a Congressional committee that he had been given questions and answers in advance.
  1959   – The first section of the M1 motorway, the first inter-urban motorway in the United Kingdom, is opened between the present junctions 5 and 18, along with the M10 motorway and M45 motorway.
1960 – Penguin Books is found not guilty of obscenity in the trial R v Penguin Books Ltd, the Lady Chatterley's Lover case.
1963 – South Vietnamese President Ngô Đình Diệm is assassinated following a military coup.
1964 – King Saud of Saudi Arabia is deposed by a family coup, and replaced by his half-brother Faisal.
1965 – Norman Morrison, a 31-year-old Quaker, sets himself on fire in front of the river entrance to the Pentagon to protest the use of napalm in the Vietnam war.
1966 – The Cuban Adjustment Act comes into force, allowing 123,000 Cubans the opportunity to apply for permanent residence in the United States.
1967 – Vietnam War: US President Lyndon B. Johnson and "The Wise Men" conclude that the American people should be given more optimistic reports on the progress of the war.
1982 – Channel 4 starts broadcasting.
1983 – U.S. President Ronald Reagan signs a bill creating Martin Luther King, Jr. Day.
1984 – Capital punishment: Velma Barfield becomes the first woman executed in the United States since 1962.
1986 – Lebanon hostage crisis: U.S. hostage David Jacobsen is released in Beirut after 17 months in captivity.
1988 – The Morris worm, the first Internet-distributed computer worm to gain significant mainstream media attention, is launched from MIT.
  1988   – LOT Polish Airlines Flight 703 crashes in Białobrzegi, Podkarpackie Voivodeship, Poland, killing one person and injuring several more.
1990 – British Satellite Broadcasting and Sky Television plc merge to form BSkyB as a result of massive losses.
1997 – Tropical Storm Linda makes landfall in the Mekong Delta in Vietnam, causing more than 3,000 deaths.
1999 – Honolulu shootings: In the worst mass murder in the history of Hawaii, a gunman shoots at eight people in his workplace, killing seven.
2000 – Expedition 1 arrived at the International Space Station for the first long-duration stay onboard. From this day to present, a continuous human presence in space on the station remains uninterrupted.
2008 – Lewis Hamilton secured his maiden Formula One Drivers' Championship Title by one point ahead of Felipe Massa at the Brazilian Grand Prix, after a pass for fifth place against the Toyota of Timo Glock on the final lap of the race.
2016 – The Chicago Cubs defeat the Cleveland Indians in the World Series, ending the longest Major League Baseball championship drought at 108 years.

Births

Pre-1600
 971 – Mahmud of Ghazni (d. 1030)
1418 – Gaspare Nadi, Italian builder and writer (d. 1504)
1428 – Yolande, Duchess of Lorraine (d. 1483)
1470 – Edward V of England (d. 1483)
1475 – Anne of York, seventh child of King Edward IV of England and Elizabeth Woodville (d. 1511)
1549 – Anna of Austria, Queen of Spain (d. 1580)

1601–1900
1636 – Edward Colston, English merchant and politician (d. 1721)
1649 – Esmé Stewart, 2nd Duke of Richmond (d. 1660)
1696 – Conrad Weiser, American soldier, monk, and judge (d. 1760)
1699 – Jean-Baptiste-Siméon Chardin, French painter and educator (d. 1779)
1709 – Anne, Princess Royal and Princess of Orange (d. 1759)
1734 – Daniel Boone, American hunter and explorer (d. 1820)
1755 – Marie Antoinette, Austrian-French queen consort of Louis XVI of France (d. 1793)
1777 – Fortunat Alojzy Gonzaga Żółkowski, Polish actor and translator (d. 1822)
1795 – James K. Polk, American lawyer and politician, 11th President of the United States (d. 1849)
1799 – John Light Atlee, American physician and surgeon (d. 1885)
1808 – Jules Amédée Barbey d'Aurevilly, French author and critic (d. 1889)
1815 – George Boole, English mathematician and philosopher (d. 1864)
1821 – George Bowen, Irish-English diplomat, 5th Governor-General of New Zealand (d. 1899)
1837 – Émile Bayard, French illustrator and painter (d. 1891)
1844 – Mehmed V, Ottoman sultan (d. 1918)
  1844   – John J. Loud, American inventor (d. 1916)
1847 – Georges Sorel, French philosopher and author (d. 1922)
1855 – Henrik Schück, Swedish historian, author, and academic (d. 1947)
1865 – Warren G. Harding, American journalist and politician, 29th President of the United States (d. 1923)
1877 – Joseph De Piro, Maltese priest and missionary (d. 1933)
  1877   – Aga Khan III, Indian 48th Shia Imam (d. 1957)
  1877   – Victor Trumper, Australian cricketer (d. 1915)
1878 – Ōkido Moriemon, Japanese sumo wrestler, the 23rd Yokozuna (d. 1930)
1879 – Marion Jones Farquhar, American tennis player and violinist (d. 1965)
1883 – Jean-Marie-Rodrigue Villeneuve, Canadian cardinal (d. 1947)
1885 – Harlow Shapley, American astronomer and academic (d. 1972)
1886 – Dhirendranath Datta, Pakistani lawyer and politician (d. 1971)
1890 – Nishinoumi Kajirō III, Japanese sumo wrestler, the 30th Yokozuna (d. 1933)
  1890   – Moa Martinson, Swedish author (d. 1964)
1892 – Alice Brady, American actress (d. 1939)
1893 – Battista Farina, Italian businessman, founded the Pininfarina Company (d. 1966)
1894 – Alexander Lippisch, German-American aerodynamicist and engineer (d. 1976)

1901–present
1901 – James Dunn, American actor (d. 1967)
1903 – Travis Jackson, American baseball player, coach, and manager (d. 1987)
1905 – Isobel Andrews, New Zealand writer (d. 1990)
  1905   – Georges Schehadé, Lebanese poet and playwright (d. 1989)
1906 – Daniil Andreyev, Russian poet and mystic (d. 1959)
  1906   – Luchino Visconti, Italian director and screenwriter (d. 1976)
1908 – Fred Bakewell, English cricketer (d. 1983)
  1908   – Bunny Berigan, American trumpet player (d. 1942)
1910 – Fouad Serageddin, Egyptian lawyer and politician, Egyptian Minister of Interior (d. 1999)
1911 – Odysseas Elytis, Greek poet and critic, Nobel Prize laureate (d. 1996)
  1911   – Raphael M. Robinson, American mathematician, philosopher, and theorist (d. 1995)
1913 – Burt Lancaster, American actor (d. 1994)
1914 – Johnny Vander Meer, American baseball player and manager (d. 1997)
  1914   – Ray Walston, American actor (d. 2001)
1915 – Sidney Luft, American film producer (d. 2005)
1917 – Ann Rutherford, American actress (d. 2012)
1918 – Alexander Vraciu, American commander and pilot of Romanian descent (d. 2015)
1919 – Warren Stevens, American actor (d. 2012)
1920 – Bill Mazer, Ukrainian-American journalist and sportscaster (d. 2013)
1921 – Shepard Menken, American actor (d. 1999)
  1921   – Bill Mosienko, Canadian ice hockey player and coach (d. 1994)
1923 – Tibor Rosenbaum, Hungarian-born Swiss rabbi and businessman (d. 1980)
1924 – David Bauer, Canadian ice hockey player and coach (d. 1988)
  1924   – Rudy Van Gelder, American record producer and engineer (d. 2016)
1926 – Myer Skoog, American basketball player (d. 2019)
  1926   – Charlie Walker, American country music singer-songwriter, guitarist, and DJ (d. 2008)
1927 – Steve Ditko, American author and illustrator (d. 2018)
  1927   – John Sainsbury, Baron Sainsbury of Preston Candover, English businessman and politician (d. 2022)
1928 – Gerry Alexander, Jamaican cricketer and veterinarian (d. 2011)
  1928   – Paul Johnson, English journalist, historian, and author (d. 2023)
1929 – Amar Bose, American engineer and businessman, founded the Bose Corporation (d. 2013)
  1929   – Robert Gover, American journalist and author (d. 2015)
  1929   – Muhammad Rafiq Tarar, Pakistani judge and politician, 9th President of Pakistan (d. 2022)
  1929   – Richard E. Taylor, Canadian physicist and academic, Nobel Prize laureate (d. 2018)
1931 – Phil Woods, American saxophonist, composer, and bandleader (d. 2015)
1933 – Clarence D. Rappleyea Jr., American lawyer and politician (d. 2016)
1934 – Ken Rosewall, Australian tennis player
1935 – Shirshendu Mukhopadhyay, Indian author
1936 – Rose Bird, American lawyer and judge, 25th Chief Justice of California (d. 1999)
1937 – Earl Carroll, American singer (d. 2012)
  1938   – Pat Buchanan, American journalist and politician
  1938   – David Eden Lane, American white supremacist (d. 2007)
  1938   – Queen Sofía of Spain
1939 – Pauline Neville-Jones, Baroness Neville-Jones, English broadcaster and politician, Minister for Security
  1939   – Richard Serra, American sculptor and academic
1940 – Jim Bakken, American football player
  1940   – Phil Minton, English singer and trumpet player
1941 – Arun Shourie, Indian journalist, economist, and politician, Indian Minister of Communications
  1941   – Dave Stockton, American golfer
  1941   – Bruce Welch, English singer-songwriter, guitarist, and producer
1942 – Shere Hite, German sexologist, author, and educator (d. 2020)
  1942   – Stefanie Powers, American actress
1943 – Oldřich Pelčák, Czech cosmonaut and engineer
1944 – Patrice Chéreau, French actor, director, producer, and screenwriter (d. 2013)
  1944   – Keith Emerson, English pianist, keyboard player, and composer (d. 2016)
1945 – Giorgos Kolokithas, Greek basketball player (d. 2013)
  1945   – Larry Little, American football player
  1945   – J. D. Souther, American singer-songwriter, guitarist, and actor
1946 – Alan Jones, Australian race car driver and sportscaster
  1946   – Giuseppe Sinopoli, Italian conductor and composer (d. 2001)
1947 – Dave Pegg, English bass player and producer
1949 – Lois McMaster Bujold, American author
1951 – Thomas Mallon, American novelist, essayist, and critic
  1951   – Lindy Morrison, Australian rock drummer
1952 – Maxine Nightingale, English R&B/soul singer 
1955 – Thomas Grunenberg, German footballer and manager
1956 – Dale Brown, American author and pilot
1957 – Carter Beauford, American drummer and composer
1958 – Willie McGee, American baseball player and manager
1959 – Peter Mullan, Scottish actor, director, and screenwriter
1960 – Rosalyn Fairbank, South African tennis player
1961 – k.d. lang, Canadian singer-songwriter, producer, and actress
  1961   – Jeff Tedford, American football player and coach
1962 – Mireille Delunsch, French operatic soprano 
  1962   – Derek Mountfield, English footballer and manager
1963 – Bobby Dall, American bass player 
  1963   – Brian Kemp, American politician, 83rd Governor of Georgia
  1963   – Borut Pahor, Slovenian lawyer and politician, 4th President of Slovenia
1965 – Nick Boles, English businessman and politician
  1965   – Shah Rukh Khan, Indian film actor, producer and television host
1966 – David Schwimmer, American actor
1967 – Kurt Elling, American singer-songwriter
  1967   – Scott Walker, American politician, 45th Governor of Wisconsin
1968 – Neal Casal, American singer-songwriter, guitarist, and photographer (d. 2019)
1969 – Reginald Arvizu, American rock musician
1972 – Marion Posch, Italian snowboarder
  1972   – Darío Silva, Uruguayan footballer and coach
  1972   – Vladimir Vorobiev, Russian ice hockey player and coach
  1972   – Samantha Womack, British actress, singer and director
1973 – Ben Graham, Australian footballer
  1973   – Marisol Nichols, American actress
1974 – Orlando Cabrera, Colombian-American baseball player
  1974   – Nelly, American rapper
  1974   – Prodigy, American rapper (d. 2017)
  1974   – Ruslan Salei, Belarusian ice hockey player (d. 2011)
1975 – Stéphane Sarrazin, French race car driver
  1975   – Chris Walla, American singer-songwriter, guitarist, and producer
  1976   – Thierry Omeyer, French handball goalkeeper
  1976   – Sidney Ponson, Aruban baseball player
1977 – Rodney Buford, American basketball player
  1977   – Konstantinos Economidis, Greek tennis player
  1977   – Leon Taylor, English diver and sportscaster
1978 – Carmen Cali, American baseball player
1979 – Simone Puleo, Italian footballer
1980 – Diego Lugano, Uruguayan footballer
  1980   – Amos Roberts, Australian rugby player
1981 – Monica Iozzi, Brazilian actress
  1981   – Mitchell Johnson, Australian cricketer
  1981   – Rafael Márquez Lugo, Mexican footballer
  1981   – Miryo, South Korean rapper
  1981   – Roddy White, American football player
1982 – Yunel Escobar, Cuban-American baseball player
  1982   – Charles Itandje, French footballer
1983 – Ebonette Deigaeruk, Nauruan weightlifter
  1983   – Darren Young, American wrestler
1986 – Andy Rautins, Canadian basketball player
1987 – Danny Cipriani, English rugby player
1988 – Lisa Bowman, Irish netball player
  1988   – Julia Görges, German tennis player
  1989   – Natalie Pluskota, American tennis player
  1989   – Luke Schenn, Canadian ice hockey player
1990 – Christopher Dibon, Austrian footballer
1991 – Jimmy Garoppolo, American football player
1992 – Naomi Ackie, British actress
1994 – Shaq Coulthirst, English footballer
1995 – Hanna Öberg, Swedish biathlete
1997 – Davis Keillor-Dunn, English footballer

Deaths

Pre-1600
1083 – Matilda of Flanders (b. 1031)
1148 – Saint Malachy (b. 1094)
1261 – Bettisia Gozzadini (b. 1209)
1319 – John Sandale, Bishop of Winchester
1483 – Henry Stafford, 2nd Duke of Buckingham, English politician, Lord High Constable of England (b. 1454)
1521 – Margaret of Lorraine, Duchess of Alençon and nun  (b. 1463)

1601–1900
1610 – Richard Bancroft, English archbishop and academic (b. 1544)
1852 – Pyotr Kotlyarevsky, Russian general (b. 1782)
1863 – Theodore Judah, American engineer (b. 1826)
1883 – William Morgan, English-Australian politician, 14th Premier of South Australia (b. 1828)
1887 – Alfred Domett, English-New Zealand poet and politician, 4th Prime Minister of New Zealand (b. 1811)
  1887   – Jenny Lind, Swedish operatic soprano (b. 1820)
1893 – Daniel Payne, American educator and bishop of the African Methodist Episcopal Church (b. 1811)
1898 – George Goyder, English-Australian surveyor (b. 1826)

1901–present
1905 – Albert von Kölliker, Swiss anatomist and physiologist (b. 1817)
1911 – Kyrle Bellew, English actor (b. 1850)
1930 – Viggo Jensen, Danish weightlifter, target shooter, and gymnast (b. 1874)
1935 – Jock Cameron, South African cricketer (b. 1905)
1944 – Thomas Midgley, Jr., American chemist and engineer (b. 1889)
1945 – Hélène de Pourtalès, Swiss sailor (b. 1868)
1949 – Jerome F. Donovan, American lawyer and politician (b. 1872)
1950 – George Bernard Shaw, Irish author, playwright, and critic, Nobel Prize laureate (b. 1856)
1952 – Mehmet Esat Bülkat, Greek-Turkish general (b. 1862)
1958 – Jean Couzy, French mountaineer and engineer (b. 1923)
1959 – Michael Considine, Irish-Australian trade union leader and politician (b. 1885)
1960 – Dimitri Mitropoulos, Greek conductor and composer (b. 1896)
1961 – Salman bin Hamad Al Khalifa I, Hakim of Bahrain (b. 1894)
  1961   – Harriet Bosse, Swedish-Norwegian actress (b. 1878)
  1961   – James Thurber, American humorist and cartoonist (b. 1894)
1963 – 1963 South Vietnamese coup 
                Ngô Đình Diệm, South Vietnamese politician, 1st President of the Republic of Vietnam (South Vietnam) (b. 1901)
                Ngô Đình Nhu, South Vietnamese politician and tactical strategist (b. 1910)
1966 – Peter Debye, Dutch-American physicist and chemist, Nobel Prize laureate (b. 1884)
  1966   – Mississippi John Hurt, American singer-songwriter and guitarist (b. 1892)
1970 – Richard Cushing, American cardinal (b. 1895)
  1970   – Pierre Veyron, French race car driver (b. 1903)
1971 – Robert Mensah, Ghanaian footballer (b. 1939)
1972 – Grigoriy Plaskov, Soviet artillery lieutenant (b. 1898)
1975 – Pier Paolo Pasolini, Italian actor, director, and screenwriter (b. 1922)
1981 – Wally Wood, American author, illustrator, and publisher (b. 1927)
1982 – Lester Roloff, American preacher and radio host (b. 1914)
1990 – Eliot Porter, American photographer, chemist, and academic (b. 1901)
1991 – Irwin Allen, American director, producer, and screenwriter (b. 1916)
  1991   – Mort Shuman, American singer-songwriter and pianist (b. 1936)
1992 – Robert Arneson, American sculptor and academic (b. 1930)
  1992   – Hal Roach, American actor, director, producer, and screenwriter (b. 1892)
1994 – Peter Matthew Hillsman Taylor, American novelist, short-story writer, and playwright (b. 1917)
1996 – Eva Cassidy, American singer (b. 1963)
  1996   – John G. Crommelin, American admiral and politician (b. 1902)
1998 – Vincent Winter, Scottish actor and production manager (b. 1957)
2000 – Robert Cormier, American journalist and author (b. 1925)
2002 – Charles Sheffield, American physicist and author (b. 1935)
2003 – Frank McCloskey, American sergeant, lawyer, and politician (b. 1939)
2004 – Zayed bin Sultan Al Nahyan, the 1st president and founder of the UAE (b. 1918)
  2004   – Theo van Gogh, Dutch actor, director, and producer (b. 1957)
2005 – Ferruccio Valcareggi, Italian footballer and manager (b. 1919)
2007 – Charmaine Dragun, Australian journalist (b. 1978)
  2007   – Igor Moiseyev, Russian dancer and choreographer (b. 1906)
  2007   – The Fabulous Moolah, American wrestler (b. 1923)
2008 – Madelyn Dunham, American banker and business executive (b. 1922)
2009 – Nien Cheng, Chinese-American author (b. 1915)
2010 – Clyde King, American baseball player and manager (b. 1924)
2011 – Boots Plata, Filipino director and screenwriter (b. 1943)
2012 – Shreeram Shankar Abhyankar, Indian-American mathematician and academic (b. 1930)
  2012   – Robert Morton Duncan, American soldier and judge (b. 1927)
  2012   – Joe Ginsberg, American baseball player (b. 1926)
  2012   – Pino Rauti, Italian journalist and politician (b. 1926)
  2012   – Han Suyin, Chinese-Swiss physician and author (b. 1916)
  2012   – Kinjarapu Yerran Naidu, Indian politician (b. 1957)
2013 – Walt Bellamy, American basketball player (b. 1939)
  2013   – Ghislaine Dupont, French journalist (b. 1956)
  2013   – Clifford Nass, American author and academic (b. 1958)
  2013   – Kjell Qvale, Norwegian-American businessman (b. 1919)
2014 – Acker Bilk, English singer and clarinet player (b. 1929)
  2014   – Michael Coleman, American singer-songwriter and guitarist (b. 1956)
  2014   – Veljko Kadijević, Croatian general and politician, 5th Federal Secretary of People's Defence (b. 1925)
  2014   – Herman Sarkowsky, German-American businessman and philanthropist, co-founded the Seattle Seahawks (b. 1925)
  2014   – Shabtai Teveth, Israeli historian and author (b. 1925)
2015 – Andrzej Ciechanowiecki, Polish painter, historian, and academic (b. 1924)
  2015   – Mike Davies, Welsh-American tennis player and businessman (b. 1936)
  2015   – Roy Dommett, English scientist and engineer (b. 1933)
  2015   – Tommy Overstreet, American singer-songwriter and guitarist (b. 1937)
2017 – Aboubacar Somparé, Guinean politician (b. 1944)
2018 – Raymond Chow, Hong Kong film producer (b. 1927)
2019 – Walter Mercado, Puerto Rican television personality, astrologer, actor, and dancer (b. 1932)
2021 – Neal Smith, American politician (b. 1920)
2022 – Atilio Stampone, Argentine pianist and composer (b. 1926)

Holidays and observances
Christian feast day:
Agapius and companions
Domninus of Vienne
Erc of Slane (Ireland)
Justus of Trieste
Victorinus of Pettau
November 2 (Eastern Orthodox liturgics)
All Souls' Day (Roman Catholic Church and Anglican Communion)
Coronation of Haile Selassie (Rastafari)
Day of the Dead, the second day of Day of the Dead or El Dia de los Muertos celebration (Mexico)
Dziady (Belarus)
Arrival of Indentured Labourers (Mauritius)
International Day to End Impunity for Crimes Against Journalists (United Nations)
Statehood Day (North Dakota and South Dakota, United States)

References

External links

 
 
 

Days of the year
November